Mary Flynn may refer to:

Mary Flynn, character in Alias Mary Flynn
Mary Flynn, character in Merrily We Roll Along (musical)